Réver Humberto Alves de Araújo (born 4 January 1985), simply known as Réver, is a Brazilian professional footballer who plays for Atlético Mineiro. Mainly a centre-back, he can also play as a defensive midfielder. He has won the Bola de Prata and Prêmio Craque do Brasileirão twice each.

Club career

Paulista
Born in Ariranha, São Paulo, Réver started his career at Paulista, a Série B football club based in Jundiaí, and was promoted to the first team in 2004. He was a part of the Paulista Championship runner-up squad and contributed to the major title of the club, the 2005 Brazilian Cup.

Réver soon became an important first teamer alongside Marcio Mossoró and Victor and attracted many other big Brazilian clubs. Despite the bad campaign in the Libertadores in 2006, he stood out and went on loan to Al-Wahda, a football club based in Abu Dhabi.

Grêmio
In early 2008, after the relegation to the Série C and the Campeonato Paulista poor campaign, Paulista sold half of Réver's rights and sent him on loan to Grêmio, reuniting with former teammate Victor. He quickly gained a first team spot and established himself as one of the bests defenders in the championship, being also one of the team's vice-captains.

On 12 November, Gremio obtained the other half of his rights and Réver signed a new five-year contract. He was an ever-present figure during the following campaigns.

Wolfsburg
In January 2010 Réver signed a five-year contract with VfL Wolfsburg. He only appeared in an UEFA Europa League match against Fulham, being on the bench during the Bundesliga season.

Atlético Mineiro
On 19 July 2010, Réver was announced as an Atlético Mineiro player for the 2010 Série A on club president Alexandre Kalil's personal Twitter account. Réver debuted for Atlético Mineiro a month later, being called up for the national time in the meantime, and became team captain in the second half of the season. The following season was difficult for the club in the Série A, struggling against relegation, but Réver won the Prêmio Craque do Brasileirão for best centre-back in the competition. In 2012, Réver captained the team in its undefeated Campeonato Minero victory, and through its Série A title contest with Fluminense. Despite the club finishing as runner-up, Réver again was selected for the team of the year, in both the Craque do Brasileirão and the Bola de Prata awards, together with teammate Leonardo Silva. Réver remained as club captain in the following season, in which he won the Campeonato Mineiro and the Copa Libertadores with the club. In 2014, he became Atlético Mineiro's top goalscoring centre-back in history with 22 goals, a record later surpassed by Leonardo Silva, who replaced Réver as captain in the middle of the season as he struggled with injury. After winning the 2014 Recopa Sudamericana with the club, another injury made Réver eventually lose his first-squad status to Jemerson in the later half of the season, and in 2015 he was allowed to leave by the club's board.

Internacional
On 14 January 2015 Réver joined Internacional on a 3-year and a half contract.

Flamengo
On 8 June 2016 Internacional accepted to loan Réver to Flamengo on a one-year spell as he had lost space in the first team squad and consistently suffered injuries. He debuted for his new club scoring the game winner header against Cruzeiro on 15 June 2016 at Mineirão Stadium.

Return to Atlético Mineiro
On 27 December 2018, Réver rejoined Atlético Mineiro on a three-year deal.

Personal life
Réver's Brazilian wife holds a German passport.

Career statistics

Club

International

Score and result list Brazil's goal tally first, score column indicates score after Réver goal.

Honours

Club 
Paulista
Copa do Brasil: 2005

Atlético Mineiro
Campeonato Mineiro: 2012, 2013, 2020, 2021, 2022
Copa Libertadores: 2013
Recopa Sudamericana: 2014
Copa do Brasil: 2014, 2021
Campeonato Brasileiro Série A: 2021
Supercopa do Brasil: 2022

Internacional
Campeonato Gaúcho: 2015, 2016

Flamengo
Campeonato Carioca: 2017

International 
Brazil
 Superclásico de las Américas: 2011, 2012
 FIFA Confederations Cup: 2013

Individual 
 Campeonato Brasileiro Série A Team of the Year: 2011, 2012
 Campeonato Mineiro Team of the Year: 2011, 2012, 2013, 2020, 2022
 Bola de Prata: 2012, 2016
 South American Team of the Year: 2013
 Campeonato Carioca Team of the Year: 2017

References

External links
 

1985 births
Living people
Footballers from São Paulo (state)
Brazilian footballers
Association football defenders
Brazil international footballers
2013 FIFA Confederations Cup players
FIFA Confederations Cup-winning players
Copa Libertadores-winning players
Paulista Futebol Clube players
Al Wahda FC players
Grêmio Foot-Ball Porto Alegrense players
VfL Wolfsburg players
Clube Atlético Mineiro players
Sport Club Internacional players
CR Flamengo footballers
Campeonato Brasileiro Série A players
Campeonato Brasileiro Série B players
UAE Pro League players
Brazilian expatriate footballers
Brazilian expatriate sportspeople in Germany
Expatriate footballers in Germany
Brazilian expatriate sportspeople in the United Arab Emirates
Expatriate footballers in the United Arab Emirates